Mallard is a markup language for the creation of help pages and user documentation for applications (technical documentation). Mallard 1.0 was released on 23 July 2013.

Mallard is an XML language. Similar to DocBook, it defines the logical structure of a document.
The documents are then displayed in a help browser, which creates links between the documents.
Concepts such as guides and topics provide means for reaching help pages in different ways.

At the moment, GNOME applications such as Web, Eye of GNOME, Evince and others use Mallard for documentation purposes.
Mallard is the preferred system for the Gnome Documentation.

Mallard pages can be viewed in Yelp, a GNOME help browser. 
Further output formats are planned that can be generated via the command line using the tools that are provided via Gitorious:
 HTML
 LaTeX
 Dot

References

External links 
 http://projectmallard.org/ project Mallard main page
 https://github.com/projectmallard sources and tools at GitHub

GNOME
XML
Markup languages
Document-centric XML-based standards
Software documentation